Dianbu is a town in and the seat of Feidong County in the eastern suburbs of Hefei, the capital of Anhui province, People's Republic of China. , it has 14 residential communities and 16 villages under its administration.

See also 
 List of township-level divisions of Anhui

References 

Towns in Anhui
Feidong County